Albert Ouédraogo (born 6 April 1969) is a Burkinabé economist who served as prime minister of Burkina Faso in the aftermath of the January 2022 Burkina Faso coup d'état, from 3 March until another coup on 30 September.

Early life and education
Albert Ouédraogo was born on 6 April 1969, in Dori, Séno. He studied partly at the Prytanée militaire de Kadiogo before continuing his education at the University of Ouagadougou, where he was excluded from studies during the 1990s for leading a student strike. He holds a doctorate in management science.

Career
Albert Ouédraogo has taught in several public and private universities in Burkina Faso. In particular, Ouédraogo taught accounting at the University of Ouagadougou as well as at the private university Aube Nouvelle. 

He also consults businesses on management and economics. 

He was appointed as prime minister by President Paul-Henri Sandaogo Damiba on 3 March 2022, following his official inauguration. His term as prime minister ended following the September 2022 Burkina Faso coup d'état.

Private Life
Albert Ouédraogo is close friends with Pierre Claver Damiba, the president of the West African Development Bank from 1975-1981, and the uncle of former Burkinabé President Paul-Henri Sandaogo Damiba.

Ouédraogo is married and has 2 children.

References

1969 births
Living people
20th-century Burkinabé people
Burkinabé economists
Prime Ministers of Burkina Faso